This list brings together authority figures—people who hold on-screen power—in professional wrestling promotions or brands within North America. The North American wrestling industry portrays authority figures as responsible for making matches, providing rules and generally keeping law and order both in and outside the ring. The role can vary according to disposition as a face authority figure tends to give what the fans want and does what is fair while a heel authority figures tend to run their shows out of their own self-interest.

WWE authority figures 

From its founding in 1963 to 1997, the WWE looked to a president as an authority figure. The president had booking power and controlled all wrestlers. However, in 1997 the commissioner replaced the president, with Sgt. Slaughter serving as the first WWE commissioner. During the Attitude Era (1997–2002), not only the commissioner, but also Vince McMahon (through his position as WWE chairman under his evil character Mr. McMahon) had booking power. McMahon usually used his power in order to haze his kayfabe nemesis, Stone Cold Steve Austin. When Shawn Michaels served as commissioner, he could overrule McMahon, but he exercised his booking power only sporadically and was working with an ironclad contract where he could not be fired. When Mick Foley acquired the position, he took full reign until he was fired from the position.

Upon splitting WWE into two separate brands in the WWE brand extension of 2002, on-screen co-owners Vince McMahon and Ric Flair proceeded to draft WWE wrestlers into two separate rosters. Flair took ownership of Raw while McMahon controlled SmackDown. After McMahon regained control of the entire company, he removed Flair from control of Raw, relinquished his own position and appointed separate general managers to control the different brands.

On July 18, 2011, Triple H came to  Raw and told Vince McMahon that the board of directors (kayfabe) revoked his "day-to-day operation power" and named him to manage it instead. After that, Triple H became the WWE's chief operating officer, who had the booking power in WWE on both the Raw and SmackDown brands until the Board of Directors stripped him of his power and named John Laurinaitis the interim general manager of Raw.

Presidents and commissioners 
 Willie Gilzenberg, WWF president (1963 – November 15, 1978, died while still in position)
 Hisashi Shinma, WWF president (1978–1984)
 Jack Tunney, WWF president (September 1984 – July 12, 1995)
 Gorilla Monsoon, WWF president (July 12, 1995 – August 4, 1997; interim president from July 12, 1995 to March 31, 1996)
 Roddy Piper, WWF interim president (1996; substitution for an injured Gorilla Monsoon)
 Sgt. Slaughter, WWF commissioner (August 4, 1997 – November 23, 1998)
 Shawn Michaels, WWF commissioner (November 23, 1998 – May 15, 2000)
 Mick Foley, WWF commissioner1 (June 26, 2000 – December 18, 2000; October 11, 2001 – November 19, 2001)
 Debra, Lt. commissioner (October 30, 2000 – March 5, 2001)
 William Regal, WWF commissioner (March 8, 2001 – October 11, 2001)
1 While Mick Foley was commissioner in 2000, he was the ultimate on-screen authority, overriding everyone else

Corporate officers 
From 1996 onwards, the corporate roles of Vince McMahon and his wife Linda were gradually acknowledged in WWF programmes and were subsequently included in storylines. The following list gives the development of corporate offices as portrayed in storylines and should not be confused with their counterparts in the actual structure in WWE, Inc. and its predecessors.

 Vince McMahon, Titan Sports/WWF/WWE, Inc. chairman of the board (since 1980, first acknowledged in 1996)
 Linda McMahon, WWF, Inc. chief executive officer (1994 – June 7, 1999)1
 Stone Cold Steve Austin, chief executive officer  (June 7, 1999 – June 27, 1999)2
 Vince McMahon, chief executive officer (June 27, 1999 – September 2, 1999)
 Linda McMahon, chief executive officer (September 2, 1999 – September 16, 2009)3
 Vince McMahon, chief executive officer (September 16, 2009 – July 22, 2022)4
 Triple H chief operating officer (July 18, 2011 – 2019)
 Theodore Long, assistant to the COO (September 5, 2011 – October 10, 2011)5
 Kane, director of operations (November 4, 2013 – November 24, 2014; January 5, 2015 – October 25, 2015)
 Stephanie McMahon, Raw commissioner  (July 11, 2016 – December 17, 2018)
 Mick Foley, general manager of Raw (July 18, 2016 – March 20, 2017)
 Kurt Angle, general manager of Raw (April 3, 2017 – December 17, 2018)
 Baron Corbin, constable of Raw (June 4, 2018 – December 16, 2018)
 Alexa Bliss,  supervisor of the Women's Division (November 26, 2018 – December 17, 2018)
 Drake Maverick, general manager of 205 Live (January 30, 2018 – April 12, 2020)
 William Regal, general manager of 205 Live (April 12, 2020 – January 5, 2022)
 Shane McMahon, SmackDown commissioner (July 11, 2016 – October 4, 2019)
 Daniel Bryan, general manager of SmackDown (July 18, 2016 – April 10, 2018)
 Paige, general manager of SmackDown (April 10, 2018 – December 17, 2018)
1 In real life, Linda McMahon served on the board of directors for the WWF's parent company from 1980. Vince McMahon appointed her to the position of CEO in 1994 during the WWF steroid scandal.
2 Storyline CEO only;  appointed in storyline by Linda McMahon. Lost his position back to Vince McMahon in a ladder match at King of the Ring.
3 Linda McMahon gained control after her husband Vince McMahon was barred from appearing on WWF television after Fully Loaded.
4 Triple H relieved Vince McMahon from his operative duties and became COO. However, Vince McMahon remained chairman and occasionally appeared as such on WWE programmes.
5 Theodore Long announced that Triple H had given him the power to book Raw when necessary. This arrangement ended when John Laurinaitis became interim general manager of Raw.

Raw authorities

SmackDown authorities

NXT authority figures

Defunct brands

Saturday Morning Slam authority figures

ECW brand authorities

All Elite Wrestling authority figures 

After the All In wrestling event in 2018, Ring of Honor wrestlers Cody Rhodes and The Young Bucks partnered with Shahid Khan and Tony Khan, the owners of Fulham F.C. and Jacksonville Jaguars, to form All Elite Wrestling on January 1, 2019. 

Shahid Khan and Tony Khan, owners (January 1, 2019–present)
The Young Bucks, executive Vice Presidents (January 1, 2019–present)
Cody Rhodes, executive Vice President (January 1, 2019- February 15, 2022)
Kenny Omega, executive Vice President (January 1, 2019–present)

Impact Wrestling figures

Chairman (CEO) 
 Jeff Jarrett (2002–2003)
 Jerry Jarrett (2002–2003)
 Panda Energy (2003–2016)
 Dixie Carter (August 12, 2016 – January 5, 2017)
 Anthem Sports & Entertainment (January 5, 2017 – present)
Dixie Carter – minority owner (January 5, 2017 – present)

Director of authority 
The director of authority operated as the on-screen authority-figure for the company.
 Erik Watts (July 23, 2003 – January 28, 2004)
 Don Callis (January 28, 2004 – February 4, 2004)
 Jeff Jarrett (February 11, 2004 – February 18, 2004)
 Vince Russo (February 18, 2004 – November 7, 2004)
 Dusty Rhodes (November 7, 2004 – June 17, 2005)
 Santino Marella (January 13, 2023 – present)

NWA Championship Committee 
TNA Wrestling also maintained a championship committee, which was established in 2004 to help the director of authority to book matches and to keep contenders in proper order. The committee members also served as guest judges for  Impact! when broadcast by Fox Sports Net as all matches had a time limit and if the match went to time, a judge had to make the call as to who had won. By June 2005, the committee was dropped and only Larry Zbyszko made appearances for the company. Despite the name, the National Wrestling Alliance had no direct relationship with the committee. During its existence, TNA controlled the booking of the NWA World Heavyweight Championship and treated it as its foremost title.

The committee consisted of:
 Dusty Rhodes (founder, original member, November 2004 – June 2005)
 Harley Race (original member, November 2004 – June 2005)
 Terry Funk (original member, November 2004 – March 2005)
 Funk never appeared on-screen in TNA
 Roddy Piper (replacement for Funk, March 2005 – June 2005)
 Larry Zbyszko (original member, November 2004 – June 2005)

Management director 
 Jim Cornette (July 16, 2006 – May 21, 2009)
Matt Morgan – bodyguard/enforcer (August 9, 2007 – April 10, 2008)

President (COO) 
 Jerry Jarrett (2002–2004)
 Jeff Jarrett (2004–2009)
 Dixie Carter (April 19, 2009 – October 14, 2010), (November 25, 2010 – March 3, 2011), (October 16, 2011 – August 12, 2016)1
Hulk Hogan – managing partner (January 4, 2010 – October 14, 2010)
 Rockstar Spud – chief of staff (November 22, 2013 – March 9, 2014)
 Hulk Hogan – (October 14, 2010 – November 25, 2010), (March 3, 2011 – October 16, 2011)2
Mick Foley – network consultant (May 3, 2011 – June 2, 2011)
 Billy Corgan (August 12, 2016 – December 2016)
1 Dixie Carter has been legitimately TNA president since 2003 after Panda Energy International became majority shareholder of TNA. However, Jerry Jarrett continued to appear until 2003 as president and Jeff Jarrett was recognised on screen from 2004 until 2009 when Carter began to have the on-screen role.
2 Hulk Hogan was (storyline) president from October 2010 to October 2011 after Carter unknowingly signed her power away to him in a contract. Carter was re-established as on-screen President following Sting defeating Hogan at Bound For Glory.

Vice president 
 Jeff Jarrett (2002–2003)

On-screen executive 
 Mick Foley – co-owner/executive shareholder (October 23, 2008 – March 22, 2010); network consultant/executive (May 12, 2011 – June 2, 2011)
 Billy Corgan (2016)
 Karen Jarrett – impact executive (January 5, 2017 – October 23, 2017)
 Bruce Prichard (January 5, 2017 – August 17, 2017)
 Jim Cornette (August 17, 2017 – September 18, 2017)

General manager (GM) 
 Sting (October 20, 2011 – March 22, 2012)
 Hulk Hogan (March 29, 2012 – October 3, 2013)
 Bully Ray (July 15, 2015 – August 5, 2015)
 Jeff Jarrett (August 12, 2015 – September 16, 2015)
 Ethan Carter III (July 8, 2015 and May 31, 2016)

TNA investor 
 MVP (January 30, 2014 – June 26, 2014)1
1 MVP was also the director of wrestling operations, but he lost his position on June 26, 2014. The investor storyline was dropped after that.

(Executive) director of wrestling operations 
 MVP (March 9, 2014 – June 26, 2014)1
 Kurt Angle (June 26, 2014  – January 7, 2015)2
1 As a result of the outcome of the Lethal Lockdown match at Lockdown, MVP partly took control of TNA as the (storyline) director of wrestling operations.
2 As a result of a decision made by TNA's board of directors, on June 20, 2014 (aired on June 26, 2014 episode of Impact Wrestling), MVP was removed as the director of wrestling operations, with Kurt Angle announced as MVP's replacement as the executive director of wrestling operations.

Knockouts Division authority figures 
 Traci Brooks – Knockouts commissioner (August 28, 2008 – January 2009)
 Ms. Tessmacher – general manager (September 20, 2010 – October 14, 2010)
 Karen Jarrett – executive vice president (September 1, 2011 – December 15, 2011)
Traci Brooks – executive assistant (September 1, 2011 – December 15, 2011)
 Brooke Hogan – Knockouts vice president (May 31, 2012 – August 16, 2013)
 Maria Kanellis – leader of the Knockouts (April 19, 2016 – October 13, 2016)1
Allie – apprentice (May, 2016 – October 13, 2016)
 Sienna – bodyguard/enforcer (May, 2016 – October 13, 2016)

1 She was told by TNA chairwoman and chief strategy officer Dixie Carter on the September 8, 2016 episode of Impact Wrestling that the decision was made by the TNA Board of Directors that as long as she has possession of the TNA Knockouts Championship, she has no decision-making authority as her being both Knockouts champion and leader of the Knockouts creates a conflict of interest. On the October 13, 2016 episode of Impact Wrestling, she lost a title vs. Knockouts leadership match against Gail Kim, thus completely removing her as leader of the Knockouts.

Xplosion commissioner 
 Desmond Wolfe (May 16, 2011 – June 16, 2011)

Executive producer 
 Eric Bischoff (January 4, 2010 – October 16, 2011)
Ms. Tessmacher – executive assistant (April 28, 2010 – September 20, 2010)
 Jeff Jarrett (February 1, 2017 – October 23, 2017)

Representative of the TNA Board of Directors 
 Earl Sullivan Armstrong (June 26, 2014) 1
1 Made the announcement on the June 26, 2014 episode of Impact Wrestling that MVP was stripped of his title as director of wrestling operations, then later on announced Kurt Angle as MVP's replacement as executive director of wrestling operations.

Representative of the Impact Board of Directors & Consultant/Advisor to Anthem 
 Tommy Dreamer (June 17, 2021 - Present)1
1 Made the announcement on the June 17, 2021 episode of Impact Wrestling that Don Callis was fired from Impact and also ceased being Executive Vice President. Dreamer also reinstated Sami Callihan.  On the June 24, 2021 episode, it was revealed that Dreamer had been asked by Anthem by stay on as the company's Consultant/Advisor within Impact.

Executive Vice President  
 Don Callis (December 5, 2017 - June 17, 2021) 
 Scott D'Amore (December 5, 2017 - Present)

Ring of Honor authority figures 

 Rob Feinstein – founder
 Cary Silkin – owner (February 23, 2002 – May 21, 2011)
 Gabe Sapolsky – head of talent relations (February 23, 2002 – October 26, 2008)
 Jim Cornette – commissioner (October 2, 2005 – November 4, 2006)
 Ric Flair – ROH ambassador (April 5, 2009 – May 30, 2009)
 Jim Cornette – executive producer (September 26, 2009 – October 13, 2012)
 Joe Koff – ROH chief operating officer (May 21, 2011 – present)
 Nigel McGuinness – match-coordinator (November 3, 2012 – December 2016)

International Wrestling Association authority figures 
 Savio Vega, general manager (2001–2006)
 Orlando Toledo, general manager (2006–2010)
 Joe Bravo, general manager (2010–2012)

World Championship Wrestling authority figures 

Ted Turner purchased Jim Crockett Promotions and launched World Championship Wrestling (WCW) in 1988. The company went through a series of vice presidents and bookers, ranging from those with little wrestling experience to those entrenched in the old territorial methods of promotion until Eric Bischoff took control in 1994. His tenure saw the creation of Nitro, the start of the Monday Night Wars and the formation of the New World Order. Declining ratings saw Bischoff ousted in 1999 and former WWF writer Vince Russo was hired in an attempt to salvage the company. WCW was purchased by the WWF in March 2001, but the company was featured prominently on WWF television as part of the Invasion storyline for the remainder of the year.

Owner 
 Ted Turner (October 11, 1988 – March 23, 2001)
Harvey Schiller – vice president of Turner Sports
 Shane McMahon (March 23, 2001 – November 18, 2001)1
 Vince McMahon (November, 2001 – present)
1 Shane McMahon owned WCW as part of the Invasion storyline, with the rights actually owned by WWF chairman Vince McMahon.

Executive vice president 
 Jim Herd (1989–1992)
 Kip Allen Frey (1992)
 Bob Dhue (1992–1995)
 Eric Bischoff (1996–1998)
 Nick Lambros (1998–1999)
 Bill Busch (1999–2000)

Vice President of Wrestling Operations
Bill Watts (1992–1993)
Ole Anderson (1993)

Senior Vice President
 Eric Bischoff (1994–1996)

President 
 Eric Bischoff (1997–September 1999)
 Ric Flair (December 28, 1998 – July 19, 1999)1
Charles Robinson – vice president
 Sting (July 19, 1999 – August 1999)2
1 Flair became on-screen president after defeating Eric Bischoff in a match on Nitro.
2 Sting became on-screen president after defeating Ric Flair in a match on Nitro, then several weeks later gave up the position for WCW to name a new president.

Commissioner 
 Nick Bockwinkel (January 27, 1994 – June 18, 1995)
 J. J. Dillon (April 21, 1997 – October 25, 1999)
 Roddy Piper (September 8, 1997 – 2000)
 Terry Funk (January 3, 2000 – January 16, 2000)
 Kevin Nash (January 16, 2000 – April 10, 2000)
Jeff Jarrett – acting/interim commissioner (January 31, 2000 – February 9, 2000)
 Ernest Miller (May 31, 2000 - October 29, 2000), (January 14, 2001 – February 12, 2001), (February 18, 2001 – February 26, 2001)
 Mike Sanders (October 29, 2000 – January 14, 2001)
 Lance Storm (February 12, 2001 – February 18, 2001)
 William Regal (October 15, 2001 – November 18, 2001)1
1 Regal served as the Alliance commissioner during the Invasion storyline.

The Powers That Be 
 Vince Russo (October 5, 1999 – January 1, 2000)1
 Ed Ferrara1
1 Upon arriving in WCW, Russo and Ferrara were introduced as the Powers That Be, a mysterious on-screen presence that controlled the company.

Leaders of The New Blood 
 Eric Bischoff (April 10, 2000 – July 9, 2000)1
 Vince Russo (April 10, 2000 – October 2000)
1 Bischoff returned to WCW as an unspecified authority figure on April 10, 2000 and alongside Vince Russo took control of the company as the leaders of The New Blood group.

Extreme Championship Wrestling authority figures 

 Tod Gordon – owner (1992–May 1995)
 Paul Heyman – owner (May 1995–April 2001)
Cyrus – Network representative (1999–2001)
 Stephanie McMahon – owner (July 9, 2001 – November 18, 2001)1
 Vince McMahon – owner (January 28, 2003 – present)
1 Stephanie McMahon owned ECW as part of the Invasion storyline, with the rights actually owned by WWE chairman Vince McMahon.

Chikara authority figures

Founder 
 Mike Quackenbush
 Reckless Youth

Owner 
 Mike Quackenbush (2002–2020)
 The Titor Conglomerate (storyline) (2010–2013)
 Robbie Ellis (storyline) (2014–2020)

Commissioner 
 Bob Saget (2006–2008)
 Dave Coulier (2008–2010)

Director of Fun 
 Leonard F. Chikarason (2005–2009)
 Dieter VonSteigerwalt (2009–2010)
 Wink Vavasseur (2010–2013)
 Mike Quackenbush (2014–2017)
 Bryce Remsburg – acting/interim director of Fun (2016)
 Bryce Remsburg (2017–present)

Other positions 
 Cavalier Jones – Member of the Chikara Board of Directors (2004)
 Wink Vavasseur – executive auditor of the board of directors (2010–2013)
 Jakob Hammermeier – King of Chikara (unofficial, 2016)

See also 
 List of professional wrestlers
 List of professional wrestling promoters

Notes and references 

 
Professional wrestling slang